The West Central Events Centre is a 2,600-seat multi-purpose arena in Kindersley, Saskatchewan.  It is home to the Kindersley Klippers ice hockey team.

On the morning of January 8, 2010, the older portion of the facility, known as Exhibition Stadium, was destroyed in a fire.

References

Indoor arenas in Saskatchewan
Indoor ice hockey venues in Canada
Sports venues in Saskatchewan
Kindersley